The Osella PA3 is a Group 6 (Sports 2000) prototype racing car designed, developed, and built by Osella, to compete in the World Sportscar Championship sports car racing series in 1975, but was used in active competition through 1986. It was powered by a number of different engines, including the  BMW M12/7, the Abarth twin-cam engine, and the Cosworth BDG, or the  Cosworth BDH, or even the smaller the smaller  Cosworth SCA. The  and  Cosworth FVA and Cosworth FVC were also used. It was even powered by a Ferrari 2.0 V8 engine.

References 

Osella vehicles
Mid-engined cars